The Tlapanec , or Meꞌphaa, are an indigenous people of Mexico native to the state of Guerrero. The Tlapanec language is a part of the Oto-Manguean language family. The now extinct Subtiaba language of Nicaragua was a closely related language. Today Tlapanecs live primarily in the state of Guerrero a number more than 98,000.

In pre-Columbian times they lived in the isolated mountain area along the Costa Chica region of Guerrero, just southeast of present-day Acapulco. Their territory was called Yopitzinco by the Aztecs who also referred to the Tlapanecs as Yopi. Yopitzinco was never conquered by the Aztecs and remained an independent enclave within the Aztec empire. The main Tlapanec city was Tlapan and the name Tlapanec is the Nahuatl for "Inhabitant of Tlapan".

Religion
The Tlapanecs explain natural phenomena through myth, like the myth of the creation of the sun (Akha'''), the moon (Gon') and the fire god (Akuun mbatsuun'), who all were born on the bank of the river and who were raised by Akuun ñee'', goddess of the temazcal sweatbath and patron of the hot/cold duality.

Another important element in their culture is nagualism. When a baby is born it is said that at the same time an animal is born and that that animal is the nahual of the child. No one except the child knows which animal is its nahual because the nahual will only show itself to the child in its dreams.

References
Tlapanecos - Ethnographic description of the Tlapanec people (Instituto Nacional Indigenista) 
SIL international on Tlapanec language and culture

Ethnic groups in Mexico
Indigenous peoples in Mexico
Mesoamerican cultures